Hermesia is a genus of leaf beetles in the subfamily Eumolpinae. They are found in Central America and South America.

The genus was previously considered a synonym of Hylax, but in 1995 it was restored as a separate genus.

Species
As of 1995, Hermesia contains three species:
 Hermesia aurata (Olivier, 1808) (Synonym: Chalcophana nitidissimus Erichson, 1847)
 Hermesia cyanea Bowditch, 1921
 Hermesia inermis Bowditch, 1921 (Synonym: Rhabdopterus violaceus Jacoby, 1882)

References

Eumolpinae
Chrysomelidae genera
Beetles of Central America
Beetles of South America
Taxa named by Édouard Lefèvre